João Pedro de Lemos Paiva (born 8 February 1983) is a Portuguese football coach and a former striker.

He spent the vast majority of his professional career in Switzerland.

Club career
Born in Lisbon, Paiva played almost exclusively lower league football in his country: having been under contract with both Sporting Clube de Portugal and C.S. Marítimo, he only appeared for both clubs' reserve sides. In the 2004–05 season he competed with S.C. Espinho in the second division, but featured in less than one third of the league games and his team was also relegated after ranking 18th and last.

Paiva then spent three years in Cyprus, with Apollon Limassol and AEK Larnaca FC (half a season with the latter). For 2008–09 he joined FC Luzern in Switzerland, scoring 11 goals in 23 matches in his first year as the side finished ninth in the Super League, only barely avoiding relegation.

In January 2011, Paiva agreed a contract with another club in the country, Grasshopper Club Zürich, effective as of July.

Coaching career
Paiva was hired as the manager of Swiss club AC Bellinzona in July 2021. He left Bellinzona on 23 August 2021 by mutual consent due to "diverging technical views", with Bellinzona winning 2 out of 3 games under his management.

References

External links
 
 
 

1983 births
Living people
Footballers from Lisbon
Portuguese footballers
Association football forwards
Liga Portugal 2 players
Segunda Divisão players
Sporting CP B players
C.S. Marítimo players
S.C. Espinho players
Cypriot First Division players
Apollon Limassol FC players
AEK Larnaca FC players
Swiss Super League players
Swiss Challenge League players
FC Luzern players
Grasshopper Club Zürich players
FC Wohlen players
FC Winterthur players
Portugal youth international footballers
Portuguese expatriate footballers
Expatriate footballers in Cyprus
Expatriate footballers in Switzerland
Portuguese expatriate sportspeople in Cyprus
Portuguese expatriate sportspeople in Switzerland
Portuguese football managers
AC Bellinzona managers
Portuguese expatriate football managers
Expatriate football managers in Switzerland